Caroline McKenzie is an Australian stage and screen actress. She is a member of the theatre and dance faculty at the Western Australian Academy of Performing Arts at Edith Cowan University.

Television
Her television work includes Ship to Shore, The Shark Net and The Sleepover Club.

Theatre
Her theatre work includes:
The 20s and All That Jazz, The Cherry Orchard, A Midsummer Night's Dream, Fen and Safety in Numbers for The Hole in the Wall Theatre.
Godspell, Chicago, The Jack the Ripper Show, On Our Selection, A Chorus of Disapproval, Company and Barnum for The Playhouse Theatre (Perth) (productions broadcast on Australian National Theatre Live).
The Philadelphia Story for Sydney Theatre Company.
The Man From Mukinupin for Q Theatre.
Ridin' High (as Ethel Merman) for Griffin Theatre Company.
Face to Face (on tour around Australia and Brazil) and The Turning for Perth Theatre Company.
The Crucible for the Black Swan State Theatre Company
Coram Boy for the Midnite Youth Theatre Company.

Reviews
In The Turning, "a malevolent matriarch as corrosive in her effect on a family as any military dictator on a nation's destiny. Caroline McKenzie's Nan, steely and precise in gesture, is a fine study in understated menace."

References

External links
 
 Perth Theatre Company Page

Australian stage actresses
Australian television actresses
Year of birth missing (living people)
Living people
Academic staff of Edith Cowan University